Gino Sciardis (28 January 1917 – 9 January 1968) was a French professional road bicycle racer. He rode in the 1948 and 1949 Tour de France. He finished in fifth place in the 1950 Paris–Roubaix.

His nephews Guido Anzile and Ugo Anzile were also cyclists.

Major results

1937
Nantes - Les Sables d'Olonne
Circuit de l'Indre
1947
Circuit des cols Pyrénéens
1948
Tour de France:
Winner stage 11
1950
Tour de France:
Winner stage 21
1951
GP du Pneumatique

References

External links 

Official Tour de France results for Gino Sciardis

1917 births
1968 deaths
French male cyclists
French Tour de France stage winners
People from the Province of Udine
Italian emigrants to France
Naturalized citizens of France
Cyclists from Friuli Venezia Giulia